Cook Hollow is a valley in Oregon County in the U.S. state of Missouri.

Cook Hollow most likely has the name of a local family.

References

Valleys of Oregon County, Missouri
Valleys of Missouri